Robert Lee Jancik, Jr. (February 9, 1940 – December 24, 2005), also known as Bobby Jancik, was an American college and professional football player, who played for the American Football League's Houston Oilers from 1962 through 1967. He died in 2005 of a heart attack.

See also
Other American Football League players

References

External links
Houston Police Retired Officers Association obituary for Jancik.

American football defensive backs
American football return specialists
Houston Oilers players
Lamar Cardinals football players
Players of American football from Houston
1940 births
2005 deaths
American Football League players